Mirpur Khas Division  is an administrative division of the Sindh Province of Pakistan. It was abolished in 2000 but restored again on 11 July 2011. formerly a part of Hyderabad Division.

Mirpur Khas is the divisional headquarter of Mirpur Khas Division. It comprises the following three districts:

Mirpur Khas District

 Mirpur Khas Tehsil
 Sindhri Tehsil
 Shujabad Tehsil
 Jhuddo Tehsil
 Digri Tehsil
 Hussain Bux Mari Tehsil
 Kot Ghulam Muhammad Tehsil

Tharparkar District

 Mithi Tehsil
 Chachro Tehsil
 Islamkot Tehsil
 Nagarparkar Tehsil
 Diplo Tehsil
 Dahli Tehsil
 Kaloi Tehsil

Umerkot District

 Umarkot Tehsil
 Kunri Tehsil
 Pithoro Tehsil
 Samaro Tehsil

Religion

References

Divisions of Sindh